Aleksandr Gennadyevich Burov (born 2 December 1975) is a former Russian football player.

References

1975 births
Footballers from Moscow
Living people
Russian footballers
FC Tyumen players
Russian Premier League players
FC Anzhi Makhachkala players
FC Arsenal Tula players
FC Khimki players
FC Mostransgaz Gazoprovod players
FC SKA-Khabarovsk players
Association football defenders
FC Spartak Moscow players
FC Rubin Kazan players
FC Spartak-2 Moscow players
FC MVD Rossii Moscow players